Aleksandr Petrovich Kedyarov  (born December 24, 1947) is a Soviet sport shooter and won a silver medal in the 50 metre running target event at the 1976 Summer Olympics in Montreal.

References

1947 births
Olympic shooters of the Soviet Union
Shooters at the 1976 Summer Olympics
Olympic silver medalists for the Soviet Union
Olympic medalists in shooting
Medalists at the 1976 Summer Olympics
Living people
Place of birth missing (living people)